Hot August Night II is a live album by Neil Diamond. This is a follow-up to his 1972 double album Hot August Night, which is also a live album. This album is certified Platinum by the RIAA.

Critical reception

Stephen Thomas Erlewine of AllMusic writes, "Running through his biggest hits, Diamond turns in a flashy, showy performance."

Track listing

Musicians

The Neil Diamond Band
Richard BennettAcoustic & Electric Guitar
Alan LindgrenSynthesizer & Piano
King ErrissonPercussion
Reinie PressBass
Tom HensleyPiano & Keyboards
Doug RhoneAcoustic & Electric Guitar
Vince CharlesPercussion
Ron TuttDrums
Background VocalsDoug Rhone, Linda Press, Ron Tutt
Additional Strings
ConcertmasterAssa Drori
ConductorAlan Lindgren
ViolinAssa Drori, Bill Hybell, Bob Sanov, Clayton Haslop, Donald Palmer, Meg Zivahi, Reg Hill, Shari Zippert
ViolaLenny Sachs, Margo MacLaine
CelloTony Cooke, Ray Kelley
BassMickey Nadel

Production
Producer – Val Garay
Mastered by Stephen Marcussen
Recording Engineers – Allen Sides, Val Garay
Arranged by Alan Lindgren
Art Direction and Design – David Kirschner
Additional Design – Jan Weinberg, Beverly Lazor-Bahr
Mixed by Val Garay
Assistant Engineers – Bob Levy, Bob Loftus
Photography by Harrison Funk
Album Production Coordinator – Sam Cole
Production Assistants – Ned Brown, Barry Cardinael, Larry Williams, Alison Zanetos

Concert production staff
Concert Production ProducerPatrick Stansfield
Tour ManagerJerry Murphey
Stage Manager & Technical DirectorDoug Pope
Lighting DirectorMarilyn Lowey

Track information and credits adapted from the album's liner notes.

Charts

Certifications

References

Neil Diamond live albums
Albums produced by Val Garay
1987 live albums
Columbia Records live albums
Sequel albums